Keith Richards is a British recording artist, most famous for his songwriting partnership with Mick Jagger, and their over-sixty-year tenure with their band the Rolling Stones. Richards has recorded and released three studio albums, one live album, one compilation album, and nine singles since 1978.

Richards has primarily worked as a session player and producer outside of the Rolling Stones, having performed on dozens of other artists' records since 1969. He began his solo recording career in 1978 with the single "Run Rudolph Run", before releasing his debut album ten years later.

On his solo albums, Richards' backing band is credited as the X-Pensive Winos, which most prominently features drummer Steve Jordan (who also serves as Richards' co-writer and co-producer), and also includes keyboardist Ivan Neville and guitarist Waddy Wachtel.

Albums

Studio albums

Live and compilation albums

Singles

Other appearances

Guest appearances

Studio

Live

Outtakes 
Screamin' Jay Hawkins  Portrait of a Man: A History of Screamin' Jay Hawkins (1995)guitar on "I Put a Spell on You" and "Armpit #6"
Alexis KornerMusically Rich...and Famous: Anthology 1967–1982 (2003)guitar on "Get Off of My Cloud" (recorded 1974 or 1975)
George JonesBurn Your Playhouse DownThe Unreleased Duets (2008)lead vocals on "Burn Your Playhouse Down" (recorded in 1994)

See also 

 The Dirty Mac
 The New Barbarians

References

Richards, Keith
Discography